Luis Daniel González Cova (born 22 December 1990) is a Venezuelan footballer who plays as a midfielder for Atlético Junior.

International career
González made his senior international debut in a 1–0 friendly win over Costa Rica. He played 79 minutes before being replaced by Ángelo Peña.

Career statistics

Club

Notes

International

References

External links

1990 births
Living people
Venezuelan footballers
Venezuela international footballers
Venezuelan expatriate footballers
Association football forwards
Caracas FC players
Deportivo La Guaira players
A.C.C.D. Mineros de Guayana players
Monagas S.C. players
FC Dallas players
Deportes Tolima footballers
Atlético Junior footballers
Venezuelan Primera División players
Major League Soccer players
Categoría Primera A players
Expatriate soccer players in the United States
Expatriate footballers in Colombia
Venezuelan expatriate sportspeople in the United States
People from Sucre (state)